Ravensbourne University London (formerly Ravensbourne College of Design and Communication) is a digital media and design university, with vocational courses in fashion, television and broadcasting, interactive product design, architecture and environment design, graphic design, animation, moving image, music production for media and sound design.

Ravensbourne was established in 1962 by the amalgamation of Bromley School of Art, Sidcup School of Art and Beckenham School of Art. It was originally at Bromley Common and later at Chislehurst and on the Greenwich Peninsula in Inner London, where it opened a new campus in autumn 2010. The college is named after the River Ravensbourne, which flows from Bromley Common to Greenwich.

History
Bromley School of Art opened in 1878 in a new building in Tweedy Road, Bromley that later became Bromley Library; after the Second World War it became Bromley College of Art. In 1959 it became Bromley Technical College after a merger with the Department of Furniture Design of Beckenham School of Art, which dated to the turn of the century as a technical school, had become an art school in purpose-built accommodation in 1908, and had expanded after the war with crafts trades. In July 1962, the remainder of Beckenham School of Art merged with Bromley College of Art and Sidcup School of Art (founded in 1898 and by then also known as Sidcup Art College) to form Ravensbourne College of Art and Design. In 1965 the college moved to Rookery Lane, Bromley Common.{ That site had originally housed the Rookery, an 18th-century house that had been burnt out while in military occupation in 1946. As the college expanded it was unable to develop that site any further, as it was in the Metropolitan Green Belt. The Rookery Lane site was redeveloped for the Bromley College of Further & Higher Education.

In 1983 the National Advisory Body for Local Authority Higher Education was set up by the Secretary of State for Education and Science, and demanded a 10 per cent cut in higher education spending across the sector. At Ravensbourne this was interpreted as requiring the closure of a department, with the communications and television broadcasting course at the College initially earmarked to be discontinued as it was on a separate campus and the closure would have allowed the College to consolidate its properties. This was later changed to a decision to cut the Fine Art course at the College on the grounds that there was a large number of similar courses offered elsewhere in the region, and this closure occurred later that year.  As a result the college was renamed to Ravensbourne College of Design and Communication. In 1985 the communications and television broadcasting course department was moved to the main Chislehurst campus from its Wharton Road, Bromley site, now occupied by St Timothy's Mews housing development.

Ravensbourne has offered higher level courses in design since the 1960s. It was amongst the earliest of institutions to be approved by the then CNAA to convert the traditional Diploma programmes in Art and Design into honours degrees during the 1970s. In April 1989 it became a Higher Education Corporation. Following the demise of the CNAA in 1992, Ravensbourne entered into a validating partnership with the Royal College of Art, which agreed exceptionally to take this responsibility. This validation ceased when the Royal College of Art withdrew from offering collaborative provision. Ravensbourne was recognised as an affiliate College of the University of Sussex in 1996, and was re-recognised in 2002. Between 2009 and 2012 the institution's undergraduate and postgraduate provision was validated by City University, London. This relationship was maintained until May 2012. In June 2013 University of the Arts London became the validating partner. In August 2017, Ravensbourne was granted the right to award its own degrees, and in May 2018 it gained university status, becoming Ravensbourne University London. In 2019 Ravensbourne began validating courses at the City and Guilds of London Art School located in Kennington in central London.

In 1999 an existing photographic and 3D studio building on the Chislehurst campus was converted into a modern library and computer facility. 

A new campus on the Greenwich Peninsula, by Foreign Office Architects, opened in autumn 2010. It is next to The O2 entertainment district and closer to partner institutions and the industries to which the college relates. In 2011 the building won a British Construction Industry Award and the RIBA education and community award.

Rave on Air
In 1971 the Broadcasting Department instituted Rave on Air, an annual student-run broadcasting event.

Curriculum and reputation

Ravensbourne offers undergraduate, postgraduate and further education programmes taught in a single faculty with two main clusters of courses, the Design School and the Screen School.

At undergraduate level, there are Foundation degrees, honours degree level top-up years (for those having completed foundation degrees or equivalent), and Bachelor's degrees.  The available postgraduate provision consists of Master's level courses, each of which can be studied to MA, MDes or MSc (dependent on subject). A range of subject areas are offered within the main disciplines of fashion, design and broadcasting.

Within the area of Further Education, Ravensbourne offers the Diploma in Foundation Studies for both Art & Design and Media, as well as the BTEC National Certificate in Art and Design.

Notable alumni
 Ray Atkins, artist
 Brian Barnes, artist
 Deirdre Borlase, artist
 David Bowie, pop star
 Joshua "Zerkaa" Bradley, YouTuber
 Dinos Chapman, artist
 Maria Cornejo, fashion designer
 Beryl Dean Disruptive embroiderer
 Rose Finn-Kelcey, artist
 Nazaneen Ghaffar, weather presenter, Sky News
 Will "Wilbur Soot" Gold, YouTuber and musician
 Robert Hewison, literary scholar

 Peter James, writer and film producer
 Andrew Kötting, Artist film maker
 John Leckie, record producer
 Anthony McCall, artist
 Stella McCartney, fashion designer
 Bruce Oldfield, fashion designer
 Chris Orr, artist
 Jay Osgerby, product and furniture designer
 Andi Osho, comedian
 Tim Pope, film director
Carol Tulloch, Professor of Dress, Diaspora and Transnationalism
Gareth Unwin, film producer
 Alison Wilding, sculptor
 Clare Waight Keller, fashion designer.

Notable faculty
 Jeremy Gardiner
 Armin Medosch

See also
 Armorial of UK universities
 List of art universities and colleges in Europe
 List of universities in the UK
 Visual arts education

References

External links
 Higher Education website
 Students' Union website

 
1962 establishments in England
Educational institutions established in 1962
Art schools in England
Art schools in London
Education in the Royal Borough of Greenwich